Steve Gulley (September 20, 1962 – August 18, 2020) was an American singer-songwriter of bluegrass music. He rose to prominence as a cast member at the Renfro Valley Barn Dance. He was one of the founding members of the band Mountain Heart, where he was lead singer until leaving in 2006. He went on to form Grasstowne and later Steve Gulley & New Pinnacle, along with recording solo and collaboration albums. He appeared on the Grand Ole Opry more than 90 times.

His son, Brad Gulley, was lead singer and guitarist for the Bluegrass band Cumberland River.

References

External links
 

1960s births
2020 deaths
People from Claiborne County, Tennessee
American singer-songwriters
American male singer-songwriters